Alonso Valderrama Airport  is an airport serving Chitré, a city in the Herrera Province of Panama.

The Alonso Valderrama non-directional beacon (Ident: CHE) is located on the field.

Airlines and destinations

See also

Transport in Panama
List of airports in Panama

References

External links
 OurAirports - Alonso Valderrama Airport
 OpenStreetMap - Chitré
 FallingRain - Chitré Airport

 Google Earth

Airports in Panama
Buildings and structures in Herrera Province